Monocerotesa is a genus of moth in the family Geometridae.

Species
Monocerotesa abraxides (Prout, 1914)
Monocerotesa coalescens (Bastelberger, 1909)
Monocerotesa conjuncta (Wileman, 1912)
Monocerotesa flavescens Inoue, 1998
Monocerotesa hypomesta (Prout, 1937)
Monocerotesa leptogramma Wehrli, 1937
Monocerotesa levata (Prout, 1926)
Monocerotesa locoscripta Holloway, 1994
Monocerotesa lutearia (Leech 1891)
Monocerotesa maculilinea (Warren, 1905)
Monocerotesa minuta (Warren, 1905)
Monocerotesa papuensis (Warren, 1907)
Monocerotesa phoeba (Prout, 1916)

Monocerotesa proximesta Holloway, 1994
Monocerotesa pygmaearia (Leech 1897)
Monocerotesa radiata (Warren 1897)
Monocerotesa seriepunctata (Prout, 1929)
Monocerotesa strigata (Warren 1893)
Monocerotesa subcostistriga (Prout, 1916)
Monocerotesa trichroma Wehrli, 1937
Monocerotesa unifasciata Inoue, 1998
Monocerotesa virgata (Wileman, 1912)
Monocerotesa viridochrea (Warren, 1907)

References
Natural History Museum Lepidoptera genus database

Boarmiini